Siri Eftedal (born May 22, 1966) is a Norwegian team handball player and Olympic medalist. She received a silver medal at the 1992 Summer Olympics in Barcelona with the Norwegian national team. Siri Eftedal played 110 games for the national team during her career, scoring 258 goals.

References

External links

1966 births
Living people
Norwegian female handball players
Olympic silver medalists for Norway
Olympic medalists in handball
Medalists at the 1992 Summer Olympics
Handball players at the 1992 Summer Olympics